MIJ may refer to:

 Mili Airport, Marshall Islands (IATA code)
 Abar language, spoken in Cameroon (ISO 639 code)

See also
Mij (disambiguation)